The ninth edition of the Copa América de Ciclismo was held on 2009-01-04 in São Paulo, Brazil.

Results

References 
 Results

Copa América de Ciclismo
Copa
Copa
January 2009 sports events in South America